The operating budget contains the revenue and expenditure generated from the daily business functions of the company; see .

It concentrates on the operating expenditures, i.e.: cost of goods sold (COGS),  the cost of direct labor and direct materials that are tied to production;
as well as the overhead and administration costs tied directly to manufacturing the goods and providing services. 
The operating budget will not, therefore, contain capital expenditures and long-term loans; for these see capital budgeting.

References

Budgets